The 1969 Colgate Red Raiders football team was an American football team that represented Colgate University as an independent during the 1969 NCAA University Division football season. In its second season under head coach Neil Wheelwright, the team compiled a 4–5 record. Alan Klumpp was the team captain. 

The Red Raiders scheduled 10 games, but only played nine, as Holy Cross canceled its trip to Hamilton after a hepatitis outbreak on the Crusader team.

The team played its home games at Andy Kerr Stadium in Hamilton, New York.

Schedule

Leading players 
Two trophies were awarded to the Red Raiders' most valuable players in 1969: 
 Al Klumpp, wide receiver, received the Andy Kerr Trophy, awarded to the most valuable offensive player.
 Eric Anderson, linebacker, received the Hal W. Lahar Trophy, awarded to the most valuable defensive player.

Statistical leaders for the 1969 Red Raiders included: 
 Rushing: Dom Fischer, 734 yards and 8 touchdowns on 223 attempts
 Passing: Steve Goepel, 1,196 yards, 88 completions and 7 touchdowns on 182 attempts
 Receiving: Alan Klumpp, 559 yards and 5 touchdowns on 40 receptions
 Total offense: Steve Goepel, 1,159 yards (1,196 passing, minus-37 rushing)
 Scoring: Two players with 48 points: Al Klumpp (5 touchdowns, 18 PATs) and Dom Fischer (8 touchdowns)
 All-purpose yards: Dominic Fischer, 1,090 yards (734 rushing, 217 kickoff returning, 86 punt returning, 53 receiving)

References

Colgate
Colgate Raiders football seasons
Colgate Red Raiders football